Burlington is a historic plantation house located near Petersburg, Dinwiddie County, Virginia. It was built about 1750, and is a -story frame dwelling with a center-passage, double-pile plan.  It has a slate gable roof with dormers.  A one-story wing was added during its restoration in 1954.

It was listed on the National Register of Historic Places in 1976.

References

Plantation houses in Virginia
Houses on the National Register of Historic Places in Virginia
National Register of Historic Places in Dinwiddie County, Virginia
Houses completed in 1750
Houses in Dinwiddie County, Virginia